Daniel 'Dani' Tortolero Núñez (born 6 September 1981) is a Spanish former professional footballer who played as a central defender.

Club career
Born in Esplugues de Llobregat, Barcelona, Catalonia, Tortolero was a FC Barcelona youth graduate. He only appeared however as a senior for the C and B teams – with the exception of two UEFA Champions League group-stage matches in the 2002–03 season, wins against Club Brugge KV (1–0, away) and Galatasaray SK (3–1, home)– being released in 2003. From that year until 2013 he competed in the Segunda División, playing 239 games and scoring 20 goals for Elche CF, Gimnàstic de Tarragona (two spells), Hércules CF, UD Salamanca, Girona FC and CE Sabadell FC.

In the summer of 2013, aged 32, Tortolero moved abroad for the first time, joining Doxa Katokopias FC in the Cypriot First Division. In July 2015, after one year of inactivity, he was supposed to sign for Romanian club FC Rapid București on a three-year contract, but the deal eventually fell through.

International career
Tortolero earned caps for Spain at under-21 level.

Career statistics

Honours
Spain U17
Meridian Cup: 1999

References

External links

1981 births
Living people
People from Esplugues de Llobregat
Sportspeople from the Province of Barcelona
Spanish footballers
Footballers from Catalonia
Association football defenders
Segunda División players
Segunda División B players
Tercera División players
UE Cornellà players
FC Barcelona C players
FC Barcelona Atlètic players
FC Barcelona players
Elche CF players
Gimnàstic de Tarragona footballers
Hércules CF players
UD Salamanca players
Girona FC players
CE Sabadell FC footballers
Cypriot First Division players
Doxa Katokopias FC players
Spain youth international footballers
Spain under-21 international footballers
Catalonia international footballers
Spanish expatriate footballers
Expatriate footballers in Cyprus
Spanish expatriate sportspeople in Cyprus